Androlepis is a genus of epiphytes in the botanical family Bromeliaceae, subfamily Bromelioideae, native to Central America and southern Mexico. The genus name is from the Greek “andros” (man) and “” (scale).

Species

References

External links
 BSI Genera Gallery photos

 
Bromeliaceae genera
Taxa named by Adolphe-Théodore Brongniart